Río Colorado Airport is a public use airport  west of Río Colorado, a town in the Río Negro Province of Argentina.

See also

Transport in Argentina
List of airports in Argentina

References

External links 
OpenStreetMap - Río Colorado Airport
OurAirports - Rio Colorado Airport

Airports in Argentina
Río Negro Province